Nuku is an element in a number of Polynesian placenames, as well as having a number of other uses.  These include:

Placenames
Nuku — a historical province on the island of Hiva Oa
Nuku (Papua New Guinea) — a district capital in Papua New Guinea
Nuku Island — an island in Tonga's Vavaʻu group. Shipwrecked (TV series) was filmed here in 2000.
Nuku Hiva — largest of the Marquesas Islands
Nukunonu — one of the three atolls that make up Tokelau
Nuku, Wallis and Futuna, a village in Futuna Island
Around Wallis Island
Nukufutu — a small islet rising several meters above the coral reef 
Nukuloa — a long, low, palm-covered island along the reef, near Nukufutu
Nukulaelae (Wallis and Futuna) — a small islet off the northern coast of Nukuloa
Nukuteatea — a low reef island about 1 mi. southeast of Nukuloa
Nukutapu — an islet about 1 mi. south of Nukuteatea
Nukuhione — an islet at the north side of the break in the lagoon's reef along the east side of Wallis I.
Nukuhifala — a somewhat larger island than Nukuhione, directly across the passage through the reef
Nukuatea — a large islet inside the lagoon, south of Wallis I.
Nukuofo — a small rock off the southern tip of Wallis I.
Nukufetao — a small rock about 1 mi. out into the lagoon S. of Wallis I.
Nukufetau — one of the atolls of the island nation of Tuvalu
Nukulaelae — one of the atolls of the island nation of Tuvalu
Nukuʻalofa — capital of the Kingdom of Tonga

People
Nuku of Tidore — anti-colonial rebel leader and Sultan of Tidore, c. 1738-1805
Lawa Nuku iii — Roller Derby player and triathlete from Hawkes Bay, b. 1976

Fish
Humuhumunukunukuāpuaʻa, the Hawaiian language name for the Reef triggerfish as well as the Lagoon triggerfish.  (The "nuku" here is not the same "nuku" as in the place names, the Hawaiian equivalent of that name being Nuʻu.)

Media
Nuku (software) — a software that teaches the syllabaries of the Japanese writing system
Nuku Nuku aka Atsuko Natsume — a manga character
All Purpose Cultural Cat Girl Nuku Nuku